Henry Jackson van Dyke Jr. (November 10, 1852 – April 10, 1933) was an American author, educator, diplomat, and Presbyterian clergyman.

Early life
Van Dyke was born on November 10, 1852, in Germantown, Pennsylvania.  He was the son of Henry Jackson van Dyke Sr. (1822–1891), a prominent Brooklyn Presbyterian clergyman known in the antebellum years for his anti-abolitionist views. The family traced its roots to Jan Thomasse van Dijk, who emigrated from Holland to North America in 1652.

The younger Henry van Dyke graduated from Poly Prep Country Day School in 1869, Princeton University, in 1873 and from Princeton Theological Seminary, 1877.

Career
He served as a professor of English literature at Princeton between 1899 and 1923.  Among the many students whom he influenced was, notably, future celebrity travel writer Richard Halliburton (1900–1939), Editor-in-Chief, at the time, of the Princeton Pictorial.

Van Dyke chaired the committee that wrote the first Presbyterian printed liturgy, The Book of Common Worship of 1906. In 1908–09 Dr. van Dyke was a lecturer at the University of Paris.

By appointment of President Woodrow Wilson, a friend and former classmate of van Dyke, he became Minister to the Netherlands and Luxembourg in 1913. Shortly after his appointment, World War I threw Europe into dismay. Americans all around Europe rushed to Holland as a place of refuge. Although inexperienced as an ambassador, van Dyke conducted himself with the skill of a trained diplomat, maintaining the rights of Americans in Europe and organizing work for their relief. He later related his experiences and perceptions in the book Pro Patria (1921).

Van Dyke resigned as ambassador at the beginning of December 1916 and returned to the United States. He was subsequently elected to the American Academy of Arts and Letters and received many other honors.

Van Dyke was a friend of Helen Keller. Keller wrote: "Dr. van Dyke is the kind of a friend to have when one is up against a difficult problem. He will take trouble, days and nights of trouble, if it is for somebody else or for some cause he is interested in. 'I'm not an optimist,' says Dr. van Dyke, 'there's too much evil in the world and in me.  Nor am I a pessimist; there is too much good in the world and in God. So I am just a meliorist, believing that He wills to make the world better, and trying to do my bit to help and wishing that it were more.'"

He officiated at the funeral of Mark Twain at the Brick Presbyterian Church on April 23, 1910.

Van Dyke died on April 10, 1933. He is buried in Princeton Cemetery.  A biography of Van Dyke, titled Henry Van Dyke: A Biography, was written by his son Tertius van Dyke and published in 1935.

Literary legacy

Among his popular writings are the two Christmas stories, "The Other Wise Man" (1896) and "The First Christmas Tree" (1897). Various religious themes of his work are also expressed in his poetry, hymns and the essays collected in Little Rivers (1895) and Fisherman's Luck (1899). He wrote the lyrics to the popular hymn "Joyful, Joyful We Adore Thee" (1907), sung to the tune of Beethoven's "Ode to Joy". He compiled several short stories in The Blue Flower (1902), named after the key symbol of Romanticism introduced first by Novalis. He also contributed a chapter to the collaborative novel, The Whole Family (1908).

One of van Dyke's best-known poems is titled "Time Is" (Music and Other Poems, 1904), also known as "For Katrina's Sundial" because it was composed to be an inscription on a sundial in the garden of an estate owned by his friends Spencer and Katrina Trask. The second section of the poem, which was read at the funeral of Diana, Princess of Wales, reads as follows:

Time is 
Too slow for those who Wait,
Too swift for those who Fear, 
Too long for those who Grieve, 
Too short for those who Rejoice, 
But for those who Love,
Time is not.

(This is the original poem; some versions have "Eternity" in place of "not.")

The poem inspired the song "Time Is" by the group It's a Beautiful Day on their eponymous 1969 debut album. Another interpretation of the poem is a song entitled "Time" by Mark Masri (2009).

In 2003, the same section of the poem was chosen for a memorial in Grosvenor Square, London, dedicated to British victims of the September 11, 2001 terrorist attacks. The poem is also used as the closing of the 2013 novel Child of Time, by Bob Johnson.

List of works

Short stories

 Among The Quantock Hills, from Days Off and Other Digressions
 Antwerp Road
 The Art of Leaving Off, from Days Off and Other Digressions
 Ashes of Vengeance (a half-told tale)
 Beggars Under the Bush
 Between The Lupin and The Laurel, from Days Off and Other Digressions
 The Blue Flower
 Books That I Loved as a Boy, from Days Off and Other Digressions
 The Boy of Nazareth Dreams
 A Brave Heart, from The Ruling Passion collection
 The Broken Soldier and the Maid of France
 A Change of Air
 A City of Refuge
 A Classic Instance
 The Countersign of The Cradle
 Days Off, from Days Off and Other Digressions
 Diana and the Lions (a half-told tale)
 A Dream-story: The Christmas Angel
 The Effectual Fervent Prayer
 The First Black Christmas
 The First Christmas-Tree
 A Friend of Justice, from The Ruling Passion collection
 The Gentle Life, from The Ruling Passion collection
 A Handful Of Clay
 The Hearing Ear
 The Hero and Tin Soldiers
 His Other Engagement, from Days Off and Other Digressions
 A Holiday in a Vacation, from Days Off and Other Digressions
 Humoreske 
 In the Odour of Sanctity
 Justice of the Elements (a half-told tale)
 The Keeper of the Light, from The Ruling Passion collection
 The Key of the Tower
 The King's High Way
 The King's Jewel
 Leviathan, from Days Off and Other Digressions
 Little Red Tom, from Days Off and Other Digressions
 The Lost Boy
 The Lost Word: A Christmas Legend of Long Ago
 A Lover of Music, from The Ruling Passion collection
 Lucifer's Virgin Body
 The Mansion, Christmas story
 Messengers at the Window
 The Mill
 The Music-Lover
 The New Era and Carry On (a half-told tale)
 The Night Call
 Notions About Novels, from Days Off and Other Digressions
 An Old Game
 The Other Wise Man 
 Out-Of-Doors in the Holy Land
 The Primitive and His Sandals (a half-told tale)
 Ships and Havens
 A Remembered Dream
 The Return of the Charm
 The Reward of Virtue, from The Ruling Passion collection
 The Ripening of the Fruit
 The Sad Shepherd, Christmas story
 Salvage Point
 A Sanctuary of Trees
 Silverhorns, from Boy Scouts' Book of Campfire Stories
 Sketches of Quebec
 Some Remarks On Gulls, from Days Off and Other Digressions
 Songs Out of Doors (Poems) small (duodecimo?) volume published by Scribner's, 1922 
 The Source
 Spy Rock
 Fighting For Peace
 Stronghold
 The Traitor in the House (a half-told tale)
 The Unruly Sprite, a Partial Fairy Tale
 The Wedding-Ring
 What Peace Means
 The White Blot, from The Ruling Passion collection
 Wood-Magic
 A Year of Nobility, from The Ruling Passion collection
 The Red Flower
 Doors of Daring

Scribner's Sons published The Works of Henry Van Dyke, 16 volumes, in 1920; it is known as the Avalon Edition.

Essays

 The Americanism of George Washington (1906)

Archival collections

The Presbyterian Historical Society has a collection of Van Dyke's sermons, notes and addresses from 1875 to 1931. The collection  also includes two biographical essays and a poem from 1912.

References

External links

 
 
 
 
Biography at the Cyber Hymnal
'Little Rivers – Henry Van Dyke' Book Review on Stray Poetry
Index entry for Henry Van Dyke at Poets' Corner
Pennsylvania Center for the Book; Van Dyke, Henry
Harper's New Monthly Magazine, "At The Sign of the Balsam Bough", Oct 1895.

1852 births
1933 deaths
American male poets
Angling writers
Presbyterian Church in the United States of America ministers
Ambassadors of the United States to Luxembourg
Ambassadors of the United States to the Netherlands
Princeton Theological Seminary alumni
Princeton University alumni
American people of Dutch descent
19th-century Christian clergy
20th-century Christian clergy
American male short story writers
19th-century American poets
20th-century American poets
Writers from Philadelphia
19th-century American short story writers
19th-century American male writers
20th-century American short story writers
20th-century American male writers
Poly Prep alumni
Burials at Princeton Cemetery
20th-century American clergy
19th-century American clergy
20th-century American diplomats